Baburin (masculine) or Baburina (feminine) is a Russian surname. Notable people with the surname include:

 Aleksey Baburin (born 1949), Ukrainian politician
 Alexander Baburin, Russian-Irish International Grandmaster of Chess
 Evgeny Baburin (born 1987), Russian basketball player
 Sergey Baburin, Russian nationalist politician
 Yegor Baburin (born 1993), Russian football player
 Vyacheslav Baburin, Russian economic geographer and regional scientist

Russian-language surnames